Arthur Farley Mayo III (May 10, 1936 – November 3, 2015) was an American businessman and politician from Maine.

Political career
Mayo served as a Democratic State Senator from Maine's 19th District, representing part of Sagadahoc County, including the population centers of Bath and Topsham from 2002 to 2006. In 2006, Paula Benoit defeated Mayo for re-election.

Mayo served on the Bath School Board from 1974 to 1978. He served four terms (1994 to 2002) in the Maine House of Representatives. On December 7. 2004, Mayo switched from the Republican Party to the Democratic Party.

Personal life
Mayo was born and raised in Bath, Maine. In 1958, Mayo graduated from the University of Maine. A year later in 1959, he graduated from Cincinnati College of Mortuary Science. In 1973, Mayo graduated with a Master's in Education from the University of Southern Maine. Mayo owned a funeral home. Mayo died of cancer on November 3, 2015.

References

1936 births
2015 deaths
People from Bath, Maine
Businesspeople from Maine
Maine Democrats
Maine Republicans
School board members in Maine
Members of the Maine House of Representatives
Maine state senators
University of Maine alumni
Cincinnati College of Mortuary Science alumni
University of Southern Maine alumni
21st-century American politicians
20th-century American businesspeople